The 2022 Odlum Brown Vancouver Open was a professional tennis tournament played on outdoor hard courts. It was the fifteenth edition of the men's event and eighteenth of the women's, which are also part of the 2022 ATP Challenger Tour and the 2022 WTA 125 tournaments respectively. It was also the first edition of the women's event as a WTA 125 after being upgraded from the ITF 100K tournament. It took place in Vancouver, Canada between 14 and 21 August 2022. The tournament could not be staged in 2020 and 2021 due to Covid-19 pandemic.

Men's singles main-draw entrants

Seeds

 1 Rankings are as of August 8, 2022.

Other entrants
The following players received wildcards into the singles main draw:
  Gabriel Diallo
  Alexis Galarneau
  Mikael Ymer

The following players received entry into the singles main draw as alternates:
  Alexander Ritschard
  Gilles Simon

The following players received entry from the qualifying draw:
  Alafia Ayeni
  Ulises Blanch
  Clément Chidekh
  Laurent Lokoli
  Govind Nanda
  Luke Saville

Women's singles main-draw entrants

Seeds

 1 Rankings are as of 8 August 2022.

Other entrants
The following players received wildcards into the singles main draw:
  Eugenie Bouchard
  Cadence Brace
  Marina Stakusic
  Carol Zhao

The following players received entry from the qualifying draw:
  Valentini Grammatikopoulou
  Catherine Harrison
  Priscilla Hon
  Yuriko Miyazaki

The following player received entry as a lucky loser:
  Kurumi Nara

Withdrawals 
Before the tournament
  Katie Boulter → replaced by  Maja Chwalińska
  Varvara Flink → replaced by  Victoria Jiménez Kasintseva
  Jaimee Fourlis → replaced by  Emma Navarro
  Linda Fruhvirtová → replaced by  Astra Sharma
  Greet Minnen → replaced by  Arianne Hartono
  Wang Qiang → replaced by  Kurumi Nara
During the tournament
  Catherine Harrison (right foot injury)

Women's doubles main-draw entrants

Seeds 

† Rankings are as of 8 August 2022

Other entrants 
The following pair received a wildcard entry into main draw:
  Eugenie Bouchard /  Kayla Cross

Withdrawals 
Before the tournament
  Tímea Babos /  Greet Minnen → replaced by  Rebecca Marino /  Heather Watson
  Emina Bektas /  Catherine Harrison → replaced by  Ingrid Gamarra Martins /  Emily Webley-Smith
  Sophie Chang /  Angela Kulikov → replaced by  Astra Sharma /  CoCo Vandeweghe
During the tournament
  Astra Sharma /  CoCo Vandeweghe (Vandeweghe – right shoulder injury)

Champions

Men's singles

  Constant Lestienne def.  Arthur Rinderknech 6–0, 4–6, 6–3.

Women's singles

  Valentini Grammatikopoulou def.  Lucia Bronzetti, 6–2, 6–4

Men's doubles

  André Göransson /  Ben McLachlan def.  Treat Huey /  John-Patrick Smith 6–7(4–7), 7–6(9–7), [11–9].

Women's doubles

  Miyu Kato /  Asia Muhammad def.  Tímea Babos /  Angela Kulikov, 6–3, 7–5

References

External links
 Official website

2022 ATP Challenger Tour
2022 in Canadian tennis
2022
August 2022 sports events in Canada